Cristin may refer to:

 CRIStin, acronym for Current Research Information System in Norway, national system owned by the Royal Ministry of Education

People 
 Surname
 Alexandra Cristin (born 1989), American model, reality television personality, and the founder of Glam Seamless
 Diego Cristin (born 1981), former professional tennis player from Argentina
 Ermanno Cristin (born in San Giorgio of Nogaro, 1945), former Italian forward football player

 Given name
 Cristin Joy Alexander (born c. 1987), Caymanian beauty pageant titleholder 
 Cristín Eugenio Cibils González (born 1956), Paraguayan former football defender
 Cristin Claas (born 1977), German vocalist and jazz singer
 Cristin Yorleny Granados Gómez (born 1989), Costa Rican footballer 
 Cristin Ann Dorgelo (née Lindsay), American CEO and President of the Association of Science-Technology Centers
 Cristin Duren, Miss Florida USA for the year 2006
 Cristin Jalbă (born 1997), Moldovan football defender
 Cristin Milioti (born 1985), American actress and singer
 Cristin verch Goronwy (12th century), the second wife of Owain Gwynedd, King of Wales
 Cristin O'Keefe Aptowicz (born 1978), American poet and bestselling nonfiction writer of The New York Times

See also 
 Cristini (disambiguation)